Psammotis is a genus of moths of the family Crambidae. The genus was erected by Jacob Hübner in 1825.

Species
Psammotis orientalis Munroe & Mutuura, 1968
Psammotis pulveralis Hübner, 1796
Psammotis turkestanica Munroe & Mutuura, 1968

Former species
Psammotis decoloralis Turati, 1924

References

External links
 UKMoths
 Lepidoptera of Sweden
 

Pyraustinae
Crambidae genera
Taxa named by Jacob Hübner